Mumthaz Moosa is a Maldivian former singer.

Career
Mumthaz was first heard in the early 2000s where he appeared in some of the local stage shows being performed at that time. After his talent was recognized by the music directors, he was offered to record several songs for studio albums and feature films where the songs "Reydhuvaa Gunamun" from Rasfarihi (2003) and "Hibakuramey" from Saahil (2004) were some of his earlier releases in his professional career. His precise rendition of the songs "Fenna Hin'dhu Konme Thaakun" from Hiyy Dheefaa (2005) and "Ulhe Ulhefa" from Ulhe Ulhefa (2005) turns to be a major breakthrough in his career. He then lent his voice for the song "Loabivaayaanulaa" from the film Zuleykha (2005) which is considered as one of the biggest hits in his career.

At the 6th Gaumee Film Awards ceremony, Moosa received two nominations as Best Male Playback Singer; one for his emotional and sorrowful rendition of the song "Hiyy Rovvaanulaashey" from the film Hiyy Rohvaanulaa (2009) and another for his vocal performance in the song "Hithu Vindhaa" from the film Dhin Veynuge Hithaamaigaa (2010).

In 2012, Mumthaz made a public announcement that he has decided to quit music and regret his involvement in the industry. Afterwards, he only performed religious tracks and advised his followers to avoid listening his music. However, even after he quits music, some of his unreleased songs were included in the soundtrack album of Vee Beyvafa (2016), Neydhen Vakivaakah (2017) and Reyvumun (2018). In 2020, he featured alongside various artists in a cover version of the song "Ilaahee Mi Bin" which was dedicated to front-liners fighting against COVID-19.

Despite stepping away from the musical scene for personal reasons, many of his songs remain popular even after several years of its release. In 2018, Mumthaz was ranked fifth in the list of the "Most Desired Comeback Voices", compiled by Dho?.

Discography

Feature film

Short film

Television

Non-Film Songs

Religious / Madhaha

Filmography

Accolades

References 

Living people
People from Malé
Maldivian playback singers
Year of birth missing (living people)